Simone Rao Grimaldi (died 12 March 1616) was a Roman Catholic bishop who served as Prelate of Santa Lucia del Mela (1602–1616).

Biography
On 15 Aug 1602, Simone Rao Grimaldi was appointed by Pope Clement VIII as Bishop of the Territorial Prelature of Santa Lucia del Mela. He served as Prelate of Santa Lucia del Mela until his death on 12 Mar 1616.

References

External links and additional sources
 (for Chronology of Bishops) 
 (for Chronology of Bishops) 

1616 deaths
17th-century Roman Catholic bishops in Sicily
Bishops appointed by Pope Clement VIII